Robert A. Rivas (born January 2, 1980) is an American politician currently serving in the California State Assembly. A Democrat, he represents the 30th Assembly District, which encompasses the Pajaro and Salinas valleys of the Central Coast. Prior to being elected to the State Assembly, he served on the San Benito County Board of Supervisors. Rivas was first elected to the State Assembly in November 2018, easily defeating Republican Neil G. Kitchens.

On May 27, 2022, Rivas announced he had votes to become the next Speaker of the California State Assembly, challenging incumbent speaker Anthony Rendon. Rendon challenged Rivas's claim, with the two meeting to talk about the challenge, later releasing a joint statement that Rendon would be the leader at last until the end of the legislative session. On November 10, 2022, the Assembly voted to make Rivas the next Speaker in 2023, alongside re-electing current speaker Rendon for the 2022–23 year. He will assume office on June 30, 2023.

Electoral history 
2018 California State Assembly election

2020 California State Assembly election

References

External links 
 
 Campaign website

Democratic Party members of the California State Assembly
1980 births
Living people
Hispanic and Latino American state legislators in California
California State University, Sacramento alumni
San Jose State University alumni
People from Hollister, California
County supervisors in California
21st-century American politicians